Alexander Ushakov (born December 28, 1979) is a Russian bobsledder who has competed since 2006. His best Bobsleigh World Cup finish was second in the four-man event at Winterberg in February 2008.

Ushakov's best finish at the FIBT World Championships was ninth in the four-man event at Altenberg in 2008.

References
FIBT profile

1979 births
Living people
Russian male bobsledders
Place of birth missing (living people)